Haloragaceae (the watermilfoil family) is a eudicot flowering plant family in the order Saxifragales, based on the phylogenetic APG system. In the Cronquist system, it was included in the order Haloragales.

Description 

The Haloragaceae ( alternate spelling Halorrhagidaceae) are very diverse in habit, including both small trees and submerged aquatics. Most members of the Haloragaceae are herbaceous, and most of those in turn are perennials, though some species are annuals. In contrast however, members of the genus Haloragodendron are woody. Most species of Myriophyllum are monoecious while most other taxa have hermaphrodite flowers.  The flowers are usually small and inconspicuous, but some genera can have more "showy" conspicuous flowers (Haloragodendron, Glischrocaryon). Flowers are usually radially symmetrical, and unusual for core eudicots, merosity is (2-3)-4 parted. Petals are usually keeled or hooded when present. In Myriophyllum female flowers usually lack a perianth. They have (2-)4-8 stamens and an inferior ovary of (2-)4 carpels. In Myriophyllum the fruit is a schizocarp of 1-seeded 'nutlets' other genera can have nuts or drupes that can be winged or inflated.  The genus Gunnera, formerly included here are now the separate family Gunneraceae.

Taxonomy

Phylogeny 

Molecular phylogenetic studies, in particular, the APG system, placed the Haloragaceae within the core eudicot order, Saxifragales. Earlier versions of the APG had allowed either the broader circumscription (Haloragaceae s.l.) or a narrower Haloragaceae s.s..

Subdivision

History 

Historically, the Haloragaceae included many disparate genera, since segregated. A major circumscription was carried out by Schindler in 1905, dividing the "Halorrhagaceae" into two subfamilies (Halorrhagoideae and Gunneroideae) and the former into two tribes (Halorrhageae and Myriophylleae), with a total of seven genera. He removed some of the disparate genera and merged Gonocarpus and Meionectes into Haloragis. This classification long remained the standard till Shaw (1966) removed Gunnera (into its own family Gunneraceae, within the order Gunnerales), the sole genus in Gunneroideae, leaving six genera. This situation remained until the monograph of Orchard (1975). Orchard restored Gonocarpus and split Haloragodendron from Haloragis, leaving 8 genera.
List of genera, habitat, distribution (Number of species)
 Terrestrial
 Glischrocaryon Endl. Australia (4)
 Gonocarpus Thunb. Australia, New Zealand, S. E. Asia (36)
 Haloragis J.R.Forst. & G.Forst. Australia, New Zealand, S. Pacific (26) 
 Haloragodendron Orchard Australia (5)
 Semiaquatic
 Laurembergia P.J.Bergius Pantropical (4)
 Aquatic
 Meziella Schindl. S. W. Australia (1)
 Myriophyllum L. Cosmopolitan (60)
 Proserpinaca L. New World (3)

Molecular era 

A molecular study resolved the infrafamilial relationships among the genera, resulting in some taxonomic revision, including redistribution of species. In addition, Meionectes was reinstated, separating two species from Haloragis and creating a new monotypic genus, Trihaloragis by segregating Gonocarpus hexandrus. Consequently the number of genera is increased to ten, with the addition of:
 Meionectes R.Br. (2)
 Trihaloragis Moody & Les (1)

Glischrocaryon-Haloragodendron is resolved as the basal node, sister to the remaining family. While monophyly of this group is well supported, monophyly of the two separate genera is less well supported, and suggests some paraphyly. Thus the generic limits remain unresolved.

A subsequent, more detailed study of Myriophyllum demonstrated that the monotypic genus Meziella was embedded within it, leading to its submersion within the former as Myriophyllum subgenus Meziella, thereby reducing the number of genera within the family to 9.

Species 

As of 2014, the family has 138 species, distributed among the nine genera as follows:

 Glischrocaryon (4)
 Gonocarpus (36)
 Haloragis (24)
 Haloragodendron (6)
 Laurembergia (4)
 Myriophyllum (60)
 Proserpinaca (2)
 Meionectes (2)
 Trihaloragis (1)

Distribution and habitat 

The distribution of the family is nearly worldwide. The center of species diversity is in Australia where all genera are found excepting Proserpinaca and Laurembergia. Habitats vary from arid desert regions to freshwater lakes. The terrestrial genera (Glischrocaryon, Gonocarpus, Haloragis, Haloragodendron, Trihaloragis ) are primarily limited to the southern hemisphere. Meionectes, Meziella, Myriophyllum and Proserpinaca are aquatic, while Laurembergia are semiaquatic. Glischrocaryon, Haloragodendron, Meionectes and Trihaloragis are Australian endemics, where about 70% of all species are found. For detailed maps of the distribution of each genus, see  Figure 1.

References

Bibliography

Books and theses 

 
 
 
 , in

Articles 

 
 
 
 
  Supplement

Websites 

 
 
 
 
 
  (see also Angiosperm Phylogeny Website)
 , in Flora of China online vol. 13

External links 

 
Saxifragales families